AEY or aey may refer to:

 Air Italy (2005–2018) (ICAO code)
 Akureyri Airport (IATA code)
 Amele language (ISO 639-3 code)
 AEY Inc., a former US-based weapons contractor; see Efraim Diveroli

See also
 Aye (disambiguation)